The 2018 Spengler Cup was held from December 26 to December 31, 2018 at the Vaillant Arena, in Davos, Switzerland.

Teams participating
  Team Canada
  HC Oceláři Třinec
  KalPa
  Thomas Sabo Ice Tigers
  Metallurg Magnitogorsk
  HC Davos (host)

Group stage

Group Cattini

Group Torriani

Knockout stage

Bracket

Quarterfinals

Semifinals

Final

All-Star Team

Source:

References

Spengler Cup
Spengler Cup
Spengler Cup